Richard Henry Myles Arkell is an English cricketer who played in three first-class matches for Cambridge University between 1953 and 1955. He was born at Abington, Northampton.

References

Cambridge University cricketers
1932 births
English cricketers
Living people